Kelsie Hogue, known professionally as Sir Babygirl, is a pop singer, songwriter, and performer.

Life and career 
Hogue was born in Palo Alto, California, and raised in New Hampshire. He studied drama at Boston University before moving back to New Hampshire, where she played in the Boston hardcore scene and developed the "Sir Babygirl" persona on Instagram. Hogue is non-binary and has stated a specific preference for both 'she' and 'he' pronouns.

Her musical influences include hardcore, pop punk, as well as early-2000s pop artists such as Britney Spears and Christina Aguilera. Hogue is drawn to the excesses and humor of pop music, but as a non-binary and bisexual person, wants to make pop that speaks to the queer experience, stating in Rolling Stone, "I always wanted to blur the lines, and challenge people to see that women and marginalized genders in music can have a fucking sense of humor and be taken seriously."

His debut album, Crush on Me was released on Father/Daughter records in February 2019. Hogue wrote and produced the album in her bedroom studio, starting in 2016. Pitchfork gave the album a 6.8 out of 10 rating, describing it as "likely to be among the year’s most extra albums." On November 8, 2019, Sir Babygirl released Crush on Me: BICONIC Edition, which is a remastered version of the album.

Discography

Albums
Crush on Me (2019)

Mixtapes
 "Golden Bday: The Mixtape" (2021)

Songs
 "Heels" (2019)
 "Haunted House" (2019)
 "Flirting with Her" (2019)
 "Pink Lite" (2019)
 "Everyone Is a Bad Friend" (2019)
 "Cheerleader" (2019)

References

Bisexual musicians
American LGBT singers
LGBT people from California
LGBT people from New Hampshire
Non-binary musicians
Musicians from New Hampshire
American indie pop musicians
Year of birth missing (living people)
Living people
Father/Daughter Records artists
Bisexual non-binary people